Mustafa Kemal Kurdaş (1920 – April 19, 2011) was a Turkish economist who served as Turkish Minister of Finance, the IMF’s adviser to Latin American governments, president of the Middle East Technical University and deputy head of the Turkish Treasury.

He is best remembered for his work to develop Middle East Technical University (ODTÜ), build a distinctive campus for it and create a forest in what was arid, eroding land. He helped found and expand a number of businesses. At the same time, he initiated archeological excavations, led the effort to salvage historical artifacts and monuments from flooding by the Keban Dam and supported the publication of findings that throw light on the Neolithic revolution. On the side, he wrote articles and books on economic policy.

His interests span archeology, architecture, business, economics, education and forestry. Kurdaş not only pursued these diverse interests but made a contribution in each area.

Youth: A free education 

His parents were descendants of Turkish and Albanian settlers in Macedonia. The ancestors had arrived in the Balkans with Ottoman armies several centuries ago, and established themselves in farming and trade. They belonged to a culturally distinct group, different from the Christians among whom they lived but highly westernized compared to the Turkish population that remained in Anatolia.

In 1912, Kemal's parents fled the Balkan Wars, leaving behind their home, land and business. They moved back to Anatolia with little to their name, ending up in the old city of Bursa, where he was born. To the end of his life, after traveling all over the world and living in different continents, he remained enthralled by Bursa with its old bridges and vistas to Uludağ, the majestic mountain known as Olympos in ancient times.

Following World War I, the Ottoman Empire was near collapse, with Istanbul and parts of Anatolia under foreign invasion. His father, Şevki Kadri, joined the war led by Mustafa Kemal, the general who rebelled against the Ottoman regime and founded the modern Turkish Republic. Şevki Kadri helped organize the local militia but was captured by Greek soldiers and held as a prisoner of war in Greece for three-and-a-half years. The son, named after Mustafa Kemal, was an infant at the time. He was only four years old when his father returned from captivity, a prematurely aged man in rags.

Sevki Kadri apparently pulled himself together to find a way to support his family. He established a small enterprise to make raki, the Turkish national drink, and wine from local grapes. His business was thriving when the new Turkish state decreed a government monopoly over alcoholic drinks and appropriated his equipment. Şevki Kadri, left with no way to earn a living and suffering from ill health, asked the government to educate his children.

As the son of a veteran, Kemal was admitted to state boarding school at age seven. He had no contact with his family until he graduated from elementary school. By the time, he went back for a visit, his father was dead and the family destitute. He lived at state boarding schools through high school and college and very rarely saw his mother, Sıdıka, and his brothers and sisters. Their affection and concern for each other survived the long absences.

Kurdaş always mentioned Şevki Kadri's patriotism and enterprising spirit as his inspiration, despite the very brief time he knew his father. His other early inspiration was his namesake Mustafa Kemal, later called Atatürk. It is said that Atatürk picked him to be given a free education because in the photo he looked more alert than other kids. Kurdaş felt he owed a large debt to Atatürk and the state that housed, fed and educated him.

Early career: Speaking truth to power 

He went to Ankara University’s school for public administration. Here, he seems to have spent much of his time at the library, where he practiced reading English. Later, his desire to improve his English incidentally led him to learn about the latest developments in economics. After he graduated and took a job as auditor at the Ministry of Finance, he discovered books on John Maynard Keynes while browsing at a foreign-language bookstore in Istanbul.

From these books, he taught himself the great British economist’s new theory of national income and employment, becoming probably the first Turkish civil servant to understand Keynesian macro economics. The Ministry sent auditors to provinces and towns to  review local government offices’ tax and spending accounts. Kurdaş was proud of being completely honest in his audits, despite repeated pressure to overlook irregularities.

During one of his stays in Istanbul, he met Ayfer, an elegant young woman interested in art and decoration. Their marriage lasted for 60 years to the end of his life and produced three children.

In 1951, he was sent to the Turkish embassy in London for a year and took the opportunity to attend classes at the London School of Economics. Back home, he rose fast at the Ministry and became deputy head of the Treasury at age 33, one of the youngest to hold such a title. But it was not to be a happy job. A financial crisis was brewing.

In 1950, a new party had come to power, promising to reverse the statist policies of previous administrations, liberalize international trade and generally relax restrictions on economic activity. Long-time import controls were lifted. Kurdaş was in favor of trade liberalization but there was a problem —the immense increase in imports depleted the country's foreign currency reserves. He diagnosed the reason: the government enforced an artificially high price for the Turkish lira, despite the liberalization rhetoric.

The official price of the lira against the dollar and European currencies was fixed at a level several times higher than the rate in the black market. Kurdaş proposed adjusting the official exchange rate to the market rate. A lower lira would make Turkish exports cheaper, leading to more exports and foreign currency earnings. The proper price for the lira would cure the trade imbalance and foreign exchange shortage.

This was sound economic reasoning. But Prime Minister Adnan Menderes believed that devaluing the currency would be a political mistake. He did not want to adjust the exchange rate. Instead, he borrowed from Europe and the United States to finance the trade imbalance.

As the overvalued lira caused an explosive demand for foreign exchange, the administration constantly arranged new loans or aid to try to meet this demand, causing the country to become increasingly indebted. Anyone who could buy dollars with lira at the overvalued official rate could sell the dollars immediately at a profit or import products that were much in demand.

The state allocated foreign exchange. Those connected to the government were able to get this scarce resource and make fortunes. Foreign exchange and imports became a major source of government patronage and corruption. Instead of developing productive enterprise, industries became dependent on the state for sustenance and the state in turn became addicted to foreign aid and loans. Businessmen focused on relations with the political class rather than on markets. Crony capitalism flourished.

Kurdaş tried repeatedly to persuade Menderes and his ministers to devalue the lira in order to cure the imbalance. While they found his expertise useful for negotiating loans, they ignored his recommendations. Instead, the government imposed new restrictions on international flows and heavy criminal sentences for unofficial foreign currency transactions. Kurdaş, criticizing these decisions, became unpopular in the government.

For his part, he was disgusted by the administration. He believed its economic policies were terrible for the country. On top of the overvalued lira, the government ran huge deficits financed by printing money. Predictably, this led to inflation. He became even angrier when Menderes encouraged a day of looting aimed at Jewish and Greek businesses in Istanbul, an outrage that caused these minorities to leave the country and destroyed centuries-old communities.

International Monetary Fund (IMF) officials came to know Kurdaş in loan negotiations and were impressed by his skills. They offered him a position at the agency. He asked Menderes for permission to take the job. The prime minister told him and an IMF official this was an honor but in reality had no intention of letting a critic of the government move abroad and join an international agency. Menderes had Kurdaş placed under daily police surveillance.

From this dangerous situation, Kurdaş was saved by his wide network of friends, men who were similarly educated at state boarding schools. Since he left his family as a child to go to school, these friends had been like a second family. Many of them ascended to high positions in the government. A friend at the passport office issued him a passport and put him on a plane to Europe.

Minister of Finance 

Thus in 1956, he escaped from an increasingly corrupt and oppressive regime. Prime minister Menderes was furious and wanted to take away his citizenship. Kurdaş became persona non grata in Turkey, unable to return to the country. He found a congenial environment at the IMF. In 1958, he was sent as adviser to Paraguay, a country he found fascinating. He traveled around Latin America, studying economic problems and suggesting solutions.

In 1960, while preparing to go on a trip to Venezuela, he learned that there had been a 1960 military coup in Turkey. Menderes was arrested. Kurdaş was invited back by the new government, to become minister of finance. Even though he liked the IMF and his wife wanted to live in America, Kurdaş felt it would be unpatriotic to turn down the offer. Despite Ayfer's objections, he agreed to go back to Ankara.

The state was nearly bankrupt. To put government finances on a sound base, Kurdaş ended the huge subsidies paid to state companies, including large banks. He increased tax revenue by enforcing the law and demanding that the wealthy declare their property. But his effort to devalue the lira led to a compromise –a lower rate only for those buying foreign currency to travel abroad– and even this was attacked in parliament.

In later years, he wrote extensively about the damage caused to a developing economy by inflation and an overvalued currency. His personal experiences and observations as well as knowledge of economic analysis inform numerous articles and several books—-including Science and Common Sense in Economic Policy published in 1979, Analyses and Comments on Economic Policy in 1994 and Endless Error: Collapse of the Turkish Economy in 2003 (titles translated from Turkish).,
 
During his time in the cabinet, a tribunal sentenced the leaders of the previous administration to death. Menderes and his long-time ministers of finance and state faced execution. Kurdaş was against the death sentences and desperately tried to stop the executions. He believed these men had pursued treasonous policies and tried to ruin his life when he criticized them but at the same time subscribed to the principle that a civilized government should not put former ministers to death. Members of the military rejected his and others’ pleas. The three politicians were hung in 1961.

Kurdaş never belonged to a political party and retained the friendship of both İsmet İnönü and Süleyman Demirel, two party leaders on opposite sides of the political spectrum. After an election, a coalition came to power. His lack of political affiliation and well-known outspokenness in policy matters kept him out of the new government. Although some of policies he proposed had not been implemented, he felt he left the country's finances in good shape, with debt reduced and foreign currency reserves in place.

The job he decided to take was to be president of Middle East Technical University in Ankara. He had a strong sense that this was an opportunity to build a world-class institution that would help solve Turkey's problems.

New campus, new forest 

What was to become Middle East Technical University was established in 1956 to educate engineers, architects and other professionals who would contribute to economic development. Initially an institute, it was turned into a university but remained very small. At the time Kurdas became president, the university consisted of temporary buildings behind the parliamentary complex in Ankara. The state had given it a huge area about 40 kilometers outside the city but an early attempt to build a campus had failed.

The land included a lake, Lake Eymir, but mostly consisted of barren hills. In the early 20th century, Atatürk tried to make Ankara greener after choosing the city as the capital of the Turkish republic. As Ankara grew it became heavily polluted, a problem greenery would help alleviate, but it was widely believed that trees could not survive the harsh climate. Yet by historical evidence, woods covered the hills in the 15th century. Men had destroyed the primal forest and because of this destruction the land eroded.

As a child, Kurdaş had been shocked by the brown, desolate landscape around Ankara when he traveled to the city the first time. Now he saw his chance to follow the lead of Atatürk and transform the arid land. In his account of his METU years, he wrote that when he went to inspect the land in 1961, he found a single forlorn-looking tree on a hill and vowed to plant many more; the little tree would no longer be lonely.

As the head of the fledgling institution, he espoused an ambitious vision to go full steam ahead to build from scratch a modern campus and at the same time create a large forest around it. There were few resources to do all this. But Kurdas raised money from international – in particular American – sources. He instituted tree planting days for thousands of students and other volunteers and persuaded an initially unwilling Ministry of Forestry to donate trees. Around a million trees were planted every year.

Two young Turkish architects, Behruz Çinici and his wife Altuğ, won the competition to design the new campus. Their unconventional design met resistance but Kurdaş decided to support the Çinici plans, which assimilated local themes into highly modern shapes, materials and technology. The modernist concrete buildings incorporate ideas from Ottoman architecture and Anatolian villages. Pedestrian paths inspired by the winding streets of traditional Turkish towns intersect the wide, tree-lined, cobblestone alley at the center of the campus.

B. Çinici was later recognized for his designs’ distinctive combination of the traditional with the technologically innovative and of buildings with the landscape. He was chosen to design the mosque in the Turkish Grand National Assembly complex, among numerous commissions and awards. Some regard the METU school of architecture building as his masterpiece.

All through his presidency Kurdaş worked to create an open-minded, tolerant culture at the university. As the 1960s progressed, he listened to students’ increasingly strident left-wing rhetoric and protected their right to free speech. He continued to focus on building the campus, transforming the arid land to forest and developing the university as a top center for  learning and research. Left-wing factions came to dominate the campus and leftist students objected to his working with American officials and donors to raise money, even as all students benefited from the resources he found.

In January 1969, while Kurdaş showed the campus to the new American ambassador, Robert Komer, a group of students burnt Komer's car. The students belonged to a Marxist–Leninist movement, but Kurdaş suspected that other parties were involved. The Minister of Interior blamed Kurdaş for this event and the university was closed for a month.

Kurdaş left METU that year. As he said farewell to the institution he regarded as his fourth child, he felt sorrowful yet contented. On his last day as president he walked along the campus main alley and through the forest to the Tree of Science, a concrete sculpture placed there years ago. He was sad but knew he had been worthy of Şevki Kadri and Atatürk. He was leaving behind a powerful center for the advance of science and education in a new green environment. It would thrive despite setbacks.

In 1995, Kurdaş, Çinici and Alattin Egemen, director of reforestation, shared the Aga Khan Award for Architecture. The award cited the unique forestation program for the  site and the very modern facilities, unusual in the Islamic world. By then more than 12 million trees, mostly oak, poplar, almond and pine, had been planted. METU was the largest green area around Ankara, helping make the city less dry and less polluted, a better place to live, according to the Aga Khan award report.

Birthplace of history 

Kurdaş entered the business world after leaving METU. For more than 25 years he was an executive or board member at a number of companies and helped start businesses, some of them pioneers in Turkish industry. At the same time he continued to pursue his interests in economics and history. His passion for history went back to his childhood, when he noticed the old bridges and buildings in Bursa and Istanbul.

Back in 1961, while visiting the village of Yalıncak on METU land, he noticed that the walls of village houses contained stones from old ruins. Around the campus were ancient sites. Ahlatibel, founded 2500 years ago, was excavated in 1933 under the aegis of Atatürk. Kurdaş and the dean of METU's faculty of architecture, Abdullah Kuran, started an excavation at Yalıncak. The village turned out to be continuously inhabited since the late Phrygian period. So many artifacts were found that a museum was created in the campus to house them. The findings were published with a preface by Kurdaş.

He was convinced that Anatolia held secrets to the making of civilization and the METU team could help in other excavations as well. The Keban Dam under construction on the Euphrates river was scheduled to permanently flood an area rich in history. Kurdaş spearheaded the effort to save the monuments and artifacts that would be lost. This effort started with a meeting at METU that included Halet Cambel, head of the prehistory department at Istanbul University. Ms. Cambel, possibly the best known Turkish archaeologist and an expert on the ancient Hittite civilization, became a friend with whom he would discuss archeological studies at length.

Kurdaş convinced then prime minister Süleyman Demirel to support the Keban historical salvage project and the government allocated money for this purpose. A campaign raised contributions from the public and international organizations provided aid. There was little time before the flooding started, but a team of Turkish, American and Dutch  archeologists led by Maurits van Loon  kept excavating even after the area was partially under water.

Later the government built more dams on the Euphrates, eventually flooding the entire river valley. Archeologists continued the salvage operation throughout this region, called Isuwa by the Hittites. They unearthed settlements going back to the Paleolithic era.

In his 80s, Kurdaş was fascinated by an excavation in southeastern Turkey that he thought might be a key for understanding the course of human history. Outside the ancient town of Urfa, a place called Göbekli Tepe, or potbelly hill in Turkish, turned out to be the grounds of a Neolithic temple more than 11,000 years old. Archeologist Klaus Schmidt found circles of massive carved stones that predate Stonehenge by around 6,000 years. Schmidt and others argue that temple construction must have led to the development of complex agricultural societies, not the other way around as previously believed.

Kurdaş thought it was important to tell the rest of the world about the Neolithic findings in Turkey. He agreed with archeologists Mehmet Özdoğan and Nezih Başgelen that Anatolia was the cradle of civilization. At the very end of his life, he intended to raise money for a series of books in English on these findings. The first of these books is dedicated to him.

In the memorial guestbook created by METU for Kurdas, Numan Tuna, a professor at the faculty of architecture whose research includes archeological salvage projects, wrote that Kurdaş played a very important role in the development of Turkish archeology, the projects he pioneered led to a paradigm change.

In a memorial speech, his son Osman Kurdaş said Kemal Kurdas followed as many as ten different paths. His legacy includes publications giving sound policy advice to developing countries, a university that every year produces thousands of graduates and about a thousand scientific articles, a forest that is an environmental godsend, a wide range of Turkish businesses, the METU museum where fascinating artifacts from Gobekli Tepe were shown at a 2011 exhibit, and perhaps most important, an attitude of tolerance and open-mindedness that is all too rare not only in the Middle East but in other parts of the world.

References

Turkish civil servants
1920 births
2011 deaths
Turkish economists
Rectors of Middle East Technical University
Ministers of Finance of Turkey
People from Bursa
Ankara University alumni
International Monetary Fund people
Turkish non-fiction writers
METU Mustafa Parlar Foundation Science Award winners
Members of the 24th government of Turkey
Members of the 25th government of Turkey
Turkish officials of the United Nations
Istanbul pogrom